Themistoklis "Themos" Asderis (1900 – 22 March 1975) was a Greek footballer who played as a defender in the 1920's and a later manager. A pioneer of Greek football and one of the main founders of Pera Club and AEK Athens.

Club career

Early years

Born in Constantinople (now Istanbul) at the beginning of the century, in 1900 he started playing football from a young age, in the only clubs that had a football department at the time, Pera Club and Enosis Tataoulon. The black July 1922 struck the Hellenism and thousands of Greeks arrived in Greece. Most of them managed to reach Athens and one of them was 22-year-old Asderis. Struck by misfortune, they soon sought the daily life of the city and two years after the war, they try to play football in a poor, wounded and suspicious towards the refugees Greece.

AEK Athens
Some of those people, in a small place in the offices of the Young Men's Christian Brotherhood of Athens in the center of city, that were housed on Mitropoleos Street, decided to resurrect the Megali Idea, that was born in Constantinople and light the flame that was burning after their drama in 1922 and thus Athlitikí Énosis Konstantinoupόleos (Athletic Union of Constantinople) were created. Before two months had passed, the newly established AEK were staffed by an overwhelming majority of Constantinopolitan footballers. Among them, the right and central defender (in a 2-3-5 formation), Asderis. In those years, football was highly amateur and there was not a Greek Federation and AEK were training in the open field next to Temple of Olympian Zeus. He formed a great defending partnership alongside Miltos Ieremiadis, for the first 5 years of the club's excistance. Asderis was a small and fast footballer and had already reached the age of 28 when AEK informally acquired their home ground in Nea Filadelfeia and managed to play on the soil of Filadelfeia before retiring from football in 1929, at the young age of 29.

Managerial career

Asderis started his career as a referee almost immediately after his retirement as a football player in 1930 and refereed football matches in both Athens and Thessaloniki for a season, but with meager results. In fact, he, alongside Sotiris Asprogerakas and the Hungarian former coach of AEK, Josef Sveg, were among the few pre-war referees in the history of Greek football.

He was one of the few people who had contact with the sport and very quickly returned to his "home", as he took over the technical leadership of AEK, after the removal of Emil Rauchmaul. With AEK he won the first Cup in the history of the institution, on 8 November 1931 against Aris with 5–3 at Leoforos Alexandras Stadium. In the same year, the state-run newspaper "Acropolis" organized a Christmas Cup in Athens with the participation of AEK, Panathinaikos, Olympiacos, Apollon Athens and the Austrian Admira Wacker. AEK also won the "Acropolis Cup" with 4–3, to a surprise of the Austrian fans and became the first team to win two Cups in a season with Asderis as their coach.

He remained at the bench of AEK until 1933 and later returned the team alongside Kostas Negrepontis in a period of decline for the team. AEK after the renewal and the arrival of the players of their academy, which was the first in Greece, such as Kleanthis Maropoulos, Tryfon Tzanetis and Michalis Delavinias, were ready to start their domestic domination. In 1937 AEK did not participate in the championship because they planned to return to their roots. They traveled to Istanbul in an intense emotional charge and participated in mini tournaments with Güneş and Fenerbahçe. They lost in the first game to the Turkish champions 2–1, but beat Fenerbahçe 3–2. At that time the club was ready for big things and proved it with the first double in the history of Greek football in the 1939. The following season was the last appearance of Asderis on the bench of AEK, again as an intermediate link in the tenure of Negrepontis. The team won the championship again and looked to the future with optimism, since their generation of players was unique and won their opponents with great ease. Unfortunately, the World War II came, as Mussolini ordered his troops to invade Greece after the historic refusal of Metaxas to surrender the country to the Italians and football was no longer priority.

Asderis spent a period at Panathinaikos, where he helped them stand alongside the other Constantinopolitan and founding member of AEK Fokiona, Dimitriadis, during the very difficult years of the Occupation. With the release of Greece and the restart of the national football championships, came the call from Olympiacos. Asderis became the first coach in the history of Greek football to work in all the clubs of the big three (followed by Helmut Senekowitsch and Jacek Gmoch) and at Olympiacos more mature than ever, he won the championship, as well as the Cup of 1947. Asderis was also part of the technical staff during three of the four spells of Negrepontis on the bench of Greece. In 1951 and at the age of 50, the Asderis retired from active role, having done everything in football as a footballer, as a coach and as a referee. He had written his name in the history of both AEK Athens and Olympiacos with a domestic double. Asderis had lived a life full of football, that ended on 22 March 1975, when he left his last breath in Athens.

Honours

As a player

Pera Club
Turkish Championship: 1922

As a coach

AEK Athens
Greek Cup: 1931–32

Olympiacos
Panhellenic Championship: 1946–47
Greek Cup: 1946–47
Piraeus FCA Championship: 1946, 1947

References

1900 births
1975 deaths
Greek footballers
Turkish footballers
Greek football managers
AEK Athens F.C. players
AEK Athens F.C. managers
Panathinaikos F.C. managers
Olympiacos F.C. managers
Turkish people of Greek descent
Footballers from Istanbul
Beyoğlu SK footballers
Constantinopolitan Greeks
Association football defenders
Emigrants from the Ottoman Empire to Greece